The Karachi Dolphins was a limited overs cricket team based in Karachi which played in National One-day Championship and domestic Twenty20. The Dolphins' home ground was National Stadium in Karachi's north end.

The Dolphins were considered one of the successful teams and had been runners-up on several occasions during the 2004/05, 2006/07, 2007/08, 2009/10, 2010/11, super 8 2011 and Super 8 2012 seasons.

Squad
Players with international caps are listed in bold.

Sponsors
 Mobilink2004
 Bilwani's Mobile2009
 Al-khair Group2010
 Chawla Group2011
 Nokia2012
 Advance Telecom2014
 QMobile  2015

Twenty20 records

Batting 
 Most runs: 1057 Khalid Latif
 Highest score: 112 Moin Khan vs. Lahore Lions
 Highest average: 53.00 Hasan Raza
 Highest strike rate: 242.85 Iftikhar Ali
 Most fifties: 7 Khalid Latif
 Most ducks: 3 Mohammad Sami
 Highest strike rates in an innings: 416.66 Tariq Haroon vs. Lahore Eagles

Bowling 
 Most wickets: 40 wickets by Shahid Afridi
 Best bowling figures in a match: 6/25 by Irfanuddin vs. Sialkot Stallions in 2006
 Best average: 7.80 Irfanuddin
 Best economy rate: 5.74 Irfanuddin
 Best strike rate: 8.1 Irfanuddin
 Most 4 wickets in an innings (and over): 3 Irfanuddin
 Most 5 wickets in an innings: 1 Irfanuddin, Fawad Alam & Sohail Khan
 Best economy rate in an innings: 2.0 Mohammad Sami vs. Abbotabad Rhinos in 2006
 Best strike rate in an innings: 3.0 Tahir Khan vs. Islamabad Leopards
 Most runs conceded in an innings: 58 Iftikhar Ali vs. Faisalabad Wolves in 2005
 Most wickets in a series: 19 Irfanuddin in 2005/06

Wicket keeping 
 Most dismissals: 33 Sarfraz Ahmed
 Most dismissals in an innings: 3 Afsar Nawaz (twice) & 3 Sarfraz Ahmed (three times)
 Most dismissals in a series: 11 Afsar Nawaz in 2005/06

Fielding 
 Most catches: 20 by Mohammad Sami
 Most catches in an innings: 3 by Khurram Manzoor, Rameez Raja, Mohammad Sami & Asad Shafiq
 Most catches in a series: 5 by Rameez Raja

Notable players
Khalid Latif
Shahzaib Hasan
Asad Shafiq
Rameez Raja
Fawad Alam
Shahid Afridi
Sarfraz Ahmed
Mohammad Sami
Sohail Khan
Tanvir Ahmed

Most matches as captain

The result percentage excludes no results and counts ties as half a win

See also
 Pakistan Super League
 Faysal Bank T20 Cup
 Pakistan Cricket Board
 Larkana Bulls
 Cricket in Pakistan
 Karachi
 Larkana Bulls

References

External links
Twenty 20 Record page for Karachi Dolphins
Cricketarchive page for Karachi Dolphins

Cricket clubs established in 2004
2004 establishments in Pakistan
Cricket teams in Pakistan
Dolphins